The Prince of Smolensk was the kniaz, the ruler or sub-ruler, of the Rus' Principality of Smolensk, a lordship based on the city of Smolensk. It passed between different groups of descendants of Grand Prince Iaroslav I of Kiev until 1125, when following the death of Vladimir Monomakh the latter's grandson Rostislav Mstislavich was installed in the principality, while the latter's father Mstislav I Vladimirovich became Grand Prince. It gained its own bishopric in 1136. It was Rostislav's descendants, the Rostaslavichi, who ruled the principality until the fifteenth-century. Smolensk enjoyed stronger western ties than most Rus' principalities.

Grand Duchy of Kiev (Princes of Smolensk)
 1010–1015 Stanislav Vladimirovich

Yaroslavichi
 1054–1057 Viacheslav I Yaroslavich
 1057–1060 Igor I Yaroslavich
 1060–1073 Sviatoslav I Yaroslavich
 1073–1077 Vladimir I Monomakh
 1077–1085 Vladimir II Vsevolodich

Monomakhovichi/Sviatoslavichi
 1092-1093 Mstislav I
 1093–1095 Iziaslav I Vladimirovich
 1095–1097 David I Sviatoslavich 
 1097–1113 Sviatoslav II Vladimirovich and Yaropolk I
 1113–1125 Viacheslav II Vladimirovich

Monomakhovichi / Rostislavichi
 1125–1160 Rostislav I
 1160–1171 Roman I (1st time)
 1171–1172 Yaropolk II Romanovich (1st time)
 1172–1174 Roman I (2nd time) 
 1174–1175 Yaropolk II Romanovich (2nd time)
 1175–1176 Mstislav I Rostislavich "The Brave"
 1176–1180 Roman I (3rd time)
 1180–1197 David II Rostislavich
 1197–1213 Mstislav II "The Old"
 1213–1219 Vladimir III Rurikovich
 1219–1230 Mstislav III Davidovich

Rostislavichi / Mstislavichi
 1230–1232 Rostislav II Mstislavich
 1232–1239 Sviatoslav III Mstislavich
 1239–1249 Vsevolod I Mstislavich
 1249–1278 Gleb I Rostislavich
 1278–1279 Mikhail I Rostislavich
 1279–1287 Theodore the Black
 1297–1313 Aleksandr I Glebovich
 1313–1359 Ivan I Aleksandrovich
 1359–1386 Sviatoslav IV Ivanovich
 1386–1392 Yury of Smolensk (1st time)
 1392–1395 Gleb II Sviatoslavich
 1395–1401 Roman II the Young, Lithuanian occupation
 1401-1404 Yury of Smolensk (2nd time)
 since 1407 conquest by Grand Duchy of Lithuania

Grand Duchy of Lithuania

Viceroys of Smolensk
 ????–???? Alexander Daszek
 ????–???? Vasil Svyatoslavich
 1482–1486 Mikalojus Radvila the Old
 1486–1492 Ivan Ilinicz
 1490–1499 Yuri Glebovich
 1499–1500 Mikalaj Ilinicz
 1500–1503 Stanislaw Kiszka
 1503–1507 Yury Solohub
 1507–1508 Yury Zenovich

Voivodes of Smolensk

 since 1514 conquest by Grand Duchy of Muscovy

Grand Duchy of Moscow

Voivodes of Smolensk
 1514–1517 Vasili Vasilyevich Shuisky
 1517–1518 Boris Gorbaty
 1520–1523 Ivan Vasilyevich Shuisky
 1523–1525 Vasil Mykulinsky
 1526–1527 Ivan Shchetina
 1527–1530 Yury Pronsky
 1531–1533 Alexander Khokholkov
 1534–???? Nikita Obolensky, The Crippled
 1547–???? Ivan Sredniy
 1552–???? Ivan Zvenigorodskiy
 1555–1556 Yury Meshcherskiy
 1556–???? Alexei Yuryevich
 ????–???? Samson Turenin
 ????–???? Nikita Obolensky
 ????–???? Ivan Andreyevich Shuisky
 1576–1577 Semeon Mezetsky
 1579–???? Ivan Kurlyatev
 ????–???? Andrei Ivanovich Shuisky
 1583–1584 Feodor Mosalsky
 1584–1587 Andrei Zvenigorodkiy
 1596–1602 Vasili Golitsyn
 1602–1602 Nikita Trubetskoi
 1602–1603 Grigori Velyaminov
 1603–1605 Vasili Cherkassky
 1605–???? Ivan Romodanovsky
 ????–???? Ivan Khovansky
 1608–1611 Mikhail Shein / Peotr Gorchakov

Polish–Lithuanian Commonwealth

Voivodes of Smolensk
 1611–1621 Mikolaj Glebovich
 1621–1621 Filon Kmita / Andrzej Sapieha
 1625–1639 Alexander Hosevski
 1639–1643 Krzysztof Hosevski
 1643–1653 Yury Glebovich
 1653–1653 Paweł Jan Sapieha
 1653–1654 Filip Obuchowicz

Tsardom of Russia

Voivodes of Smolensk

References
 Simon Franklin and Jonathan Shepard The Emergence of Rus, 750-1200, (Longman History of Russia, Harlow, 1996) ,  
 Janet Martin Medieval Russia, 980-1584, (Cambridge, 1995) ,

External links
 Medieval Lands Project

Lists of princes
Noble titles of Kievan Rus
Rurikids